Chameau Island is a rocky island  long, lying  east of Cape Découverte in the Curzon Islands. It was charted and named in 1951 by the French Antarctic Expedition. The name is suggestive of the island's form which resembles the two humps on a (bactrian) camel, "chameau" being a French word for camel.

See also 
 List of Antarctic and sub-Antarctic islands

References 

Islands of Adélie Land